Infighting may refer to:
Intragroup conflict, conflict within the boundaries of a group
Infighting (martial arts), martial arts techniques used while in close proximity to the opponent.